Jean Marc Christ Koumadje (born July 7, 1996) is a Chadian professional basketball player for Alba Berlin of the Basketball Bundesliga.

Early life and high school career
Born in N'Djamena, Chad, Koumadje first picked up a basketball when he was 15, after previously playing soccer before he lost his speed because of his growth spurts. When he was 16, in 2013, his mother relocated 3,000 km to Senegal due to the political unrest in Chad. In Senegal, Koumadje met basketball recruiter Ibrahima N’Diaye, the brother of former NBA player Mamadou N'Diaye, who approached him to work out at the Flying Star Academy in Dakar. Six months later, Koumadje received the opportunity to receive a basketball scholarship in the United States.

Koumadje played high school basketball at the Montverde Academy in Montverde, Florida, where he was teammates with Ben Simmons.

College career
Koumadje played college basketball at Florida State. During his senior season at FSU, Koumadje averaged 6.6 points per game, 5.6 rebounds per game, 1.4 blocks per game, and 15.5 minutes played per game.

Professional career

Delaware Blue Coats (2019–2020)
After going undrafted in the 2019 NBA draft, he signed with the Philadelphia 76ers. He was cut during training camp and was added to the training camp roster and opening night roster of the Delaware Blue Coats, the NBA G League affiliate of the 76ers. Koumadje had 19 points, 10 rebounds, and five blocks in a 114-107 win against the Raptors 905 on December 14. On January 4, 2020, Koumadje recorded a triple-double in a 111-88 win over the Long Island Nets, posting 12 points, 16 rebounds and a franchise-record 12 blocks. In the last 10 games of the shortened 2019–20 G League season, Koumadje averaged 11.8 points, 12.8 rebounds, and 5.8 blocks per game, shooting 66% from the field. He was named NBA G League Defensive Player of the Year.

Movistar Estudiantes (2020)
On September 21, 2020, Movistar Estudiantes announced that they had signed Koumadje.

Avtodor Saratov (2020–2021)
On December 20, 2020, he has signed with Avtodor of the VTB United League.

Alba Berlin (2021–present)
On February 25, 2021, Alba Berlin of the German Basketball Bundesliga (BBL) and EuroLeague announced that they had signed with Koumadje until the end of 2022-23 season. In his first EuroLeague season, he averaged 5.9 points and 4.2 rebounds per game.

Career statistics

NBA G League

|-
| align=center | 2019–20
| align=left | Delaware Blue Coats 
| NBA G League
| 33 || 26.4 || .635 || .000 || .679 || 10.9 || .7 || .5 || 4.0 || 11.3

College

|-
| style="text-align:left;"| 2015–16
| style="text-align:left;"| Florida State
| 26 || 1 || 6.1 || .481 || – || .412 || 1.5 || .0 || .0 || .7 || 1.3
|-
| style="text-align:left;"| 2016–17
| style="text-align:left;"| Florida State
| 35 || 0 || 10.1 || .654 || .000 || .480 || 1.9 || .1 || .2 || 1.1 || 3.4
|-
| style="text-align:left;"| 2017–18
| style="text-align:left;"| Florida State
| 24 || 21 || 16.0 || .626 || – || .583 || 4.1 || .1 || .1 || 1.5 || 6.5
|-
| style="text-align:left;"| 2018–19
| style="text-align:left;"| Florida State
| 37 || 37 || 15.5 || .627 || .000 || .582 || 5.6 || .2 || .2 || 1.4 || 6.6
|- class="sortbottom"
| style="text-align:center;" colspan="2"| Career
| 122 || 59 || 12.1 || .622 || .000 || .541 || 3.3 || .1 || .1 || 1.2 || 4.5

References

External links
Florida State Seminoles bio

1996 births
Living people
Alba Berlin players
CB Estudiantes players
Centers (basketball)
Chadian expatriate sportspeople in Spain
Chadian expatriate sportspeople in the United States
Chadian men's basketball players
Delaware Blue Coats players
Expatriate basketball people in the United States
Florida State Seminoles men's basketball players
Liga ACB players
Montverde Academy alumni
People from N'Djamena